Lathan may refer to:

Lathan (name), a given name and surname (includes a list of people with the name)
Eas Lathan, a waterfall in Scotland
, a river in France, sub-tributary of the Loire

See also 

Lathan's Gold, an adventure module for the Dungeons & Dragons role-playing game
Hatte Lathan, a village in Haiti
Channay-sur-Lathan, a commune in central France
Savigné-sur-Lathan, a commune in central France
Lathon